The 2017 Supercheap Auto Bathurst 1000 was a motor racing event for the Supercars Championship, held from October 5 to 8 2017 at the Mount Panorama Circuit in Bathurst, New South Wales, and consisted of a 1000 kilometre race. It was the eleventh event of fourteen in the 2017 Supercars Championship and was Race 20 of the season. It was also the second event of the 2017 Enduro Cup.

DJR Team Penske driver Scott McLaughlin qualified on pole with a lap time of 2:03.8312, the fastest lap of the Mount Panorama Circuit recorded by a Supercar.

The race was won by David Reynolds and Luke Youlden driving a Holden VF Commodore for Erebus Motorsport.

Report

Background 
The event was the 60th running of the Bathurst 1000, which was first held at the Phillip Island Grand Prix Circuit in 1960 as a 500-mile race for Australian-made standard production sedans, and marked the 57th time that the race was held at Mount Panorama. It was the 21st running of the Australian 1000 race, which was first held after the organisational split between the Australian Racing Drivers Club and V8 Supercars Australia that saw two "Bathurst 1000" races contested in both 1997 and 1998. It was the 19th time the race had been held as part of the Supercars Championship and the fifth time it formed part of the Enduro Cup. The defending winners of the race were Will Davison and Jonathon Webb.

Scott McLaughlin entered the event as the championship leader, 84 points clear of Triple Eight Race Engineering's Jamie Whincup. McLaughlin's DJR Team Penske team-mate Fabian Coulthard was third in the points standings, 161 behind McLaughlin. In the Teams' Championship, DJR Team Penske held a 372-point lead over Triple Eight. In the Enduro Cup standings, Prodrive Racing Australia team-mates Cameron Waters and Richie Stanaway led the pairing of McLaughlin and Alexandre Prémat by 24 points.

Entry list
Twenty-six cars were entered in the event. It was the first time since 2008 that no additional "Wildcard" entries had been received for the race. The race would see the Bathurst 1000 debut of four drivers - Super2 drivers Todd Hazelwood, Richard Muscat and Garry Jacobson and main-game debutant Alex Rullo. Rullo (at 17 years, 4 months and 23 days) would become the fourth youngest Bathurst 1000 starter after Cameron Waters (17 years, 2 months and 6 days in 2011), Paul Dumbrell (17 years, 2 months and 14 days in 1999) and Bryan Sala (17 years, 2 months and 15 days in 1991).

Notes
 — following Practice 3 Ashley Walsh was replaced by Andre Heimgartner due to injury.

Practice 
Three one-hour practice sessions were held on the Thursday prior to the race. Practice 1 and Practice 3 were open to both regular drivers and co-drivers, while Practice 2 was for co-drivers only. The first session saw Mostert set the fastest lap time of 2:06.3033. Lowndes was second fastest, six hundredths behind while Todd Kelly was sixteen hundredths further back. Tim Slade caused a red flag as a result of losing control in the Esses before heavily impacting the wall on the entry to the Dipper. The session was halted again with nineteen minutes remaining after Alex Rullo stopped on Conrod Straight having found the wall at Forrest's Elbow.

Results

Practice

Qualifying

Notes
 — James Moffat had his fastest lap time invalidated for causing a red flag.

Top 10 Shootout

Race 20

Standings after the event

Drivers Championship

Teams Championship

Enduro Cup

 Note: Only the top five positions are included for both sets of standings.

Notes

References

Supercheap Auto Bathurst 1000
Motorsport in Bathurst, New South Wales
Supercheap Auto Bathurst 1000